Sadalski or Sadalsky is a Polish masculine surname, its feminine counterpart is Sadalska or Sadalskaya. The surname may refer to
Karolina Sadalska (born 1981), Polish sprint canoer
Stanislav Sadalsky (born 1951), Russian actor
Włodzimierz Sadalski (born 1949), Polish volleyball player

Polish-language surnames